The University of Castilla–La Mancha (UCLM) is a Spanish university. It offers courses in the cities of Albacete, Ciudad Real, Cuenca, Toledo, Almadén and Talavera de la Reina. This university was recognised by law on 30 June 1982, and began to operate three years later.

Overview
The current University of Castilla–La Mancha is not the key educational institution in the region. Centuries ago, the University of Sigüenza, until the late 15th century, and the Pontifical and Royal University College of Santa Catalina of Toledo, originating precisely at the end of that same century, were already offering educational activities in the region. The University is also the partner of College of Law in Wroclaw.

Campuses and faculties
The campuses operate on a decentralised basis, although the main governing body is located in Ciudad Real, which coordinates the other centres. University courses are taught at all four locations. The Albacete campus houses Faculties of Medicine, Economic and Business Sciences, Law and Humanities. The Schools of Agronomical Engineering, Computer Science Engineering, Industrial Engineering, Nursing, Teacher Training and Employment Relations are also based there. Ciudad Real is home to the Faculties of Chemical Sciences, Law and Social Sciences, Arts, the Higher Technical Schools of Civil Engineering, Information Technology, Industrial Engineering; a Technical Institute of Agriculture; the Polytechnic University School of Almadén; a University School of Nursing; a University School of Teacher Training; and the Puertollano Centre for University Studies.

Cuenca has the Faculty of Social Sciences, the Faculty of Fine Art, the Faculty of Educational Science and Humanities, the Polytechnic University School of Technical Architecture; the Polytechnic University School of IT in Telecommunications; the University School of Nursing; the University School of Teacher Training, and the University School of Social Work. Finally, Toledo houses the Faculty of Legal and Social Sciences, a Faculty of Environmental Science; a Faculty of Sports Science; a Humanities Faculty; a University School of Nursing and Physiotherapy; a University School of Industrial Technical Engineering; a University School of Teacher Training, and the CEU centre at Talavera de la Reina.

References

External links

UCLM official website (English version)

 
1982 establishments in Spain
Universities and colleges in Spain
Education in Castilla–La Mancha
Educational institutions established in 1982
Public universities
Buildings and structures in Castilla–La Mancha